USS Defiance (PGM-95/PG-95) was a gunboat in the United States Navy and later transferred to Turkey.

Design and construction
She had a crew of three officers, and 21 crewmembers. This system allowed for them to cruise at economical oil use levels, by only using the diesel engines, but also sail quickly when needed, by using the gas turbine. The ship was armed with one 3"/50 caliber gun, one Bofors 40 mm gun, and two twin .50 caliber machine guns. Defiance was laid down by Peterson Builders, in Sturgeon Bay, Wisconsin, on 3 October 1967. She was launched on 24 August 1968, and commissioned on 24 September 1969. Her identifying symbol was of a clenched fist holding three lightning bolts, with the motto "With Knowledge and Confidence to Defy".

Service history
Defiance was decommissioned on 11 June 1973, in Izmir, Turkey, and immediately after she was transferred to the Turkish Navy, renamed as Yildirim (P-338). She was destroyed by an explosion, and the ensuing fire, on 11 April 1985, off the coast of the Greek island of Mitylene, in the Aegean Sea. She was struck from the Turkish navy register on 6 July 1987.

References

Citations

Books

Websites

External links

 

Asheville-class gunboats
1968 ships
Patrol vessels of the United States
Asheville-class gunboats of the Turkish Navy
Maritime incidents in 1985
Shipwrecks in the Aegean Sea
Ships built by Peterson Builders